In fluid dynamics, Taylor–Culick flow describes the axisymmetric flow inside a long slender cylinder with one end closed, supplied by a constant flow injection through the sidewall. The flow is named after Geoffrey Ingram Taylor and F. E. C. Culick, since Taylor showed first in 1956 that the flow inside such a configuration is inviscid and rotational and later in 1966, Culick found a self-similar solution to the problem applied to solid-propellant rocket combustion. Although the solution is derived for inviscid equation, it satisfies the non-slip condition at the wall since as Taylor argued that the boundary layer that be supposed to exist if any at the sidewall will be blown off by flow injection. Hence, the flow is referred to as quasi-viscous.

Flow description
The axisymmetric inviscid equation is governed by Hicks equation, that reduces when no swirl is present (i.e., zero circulation) to

The function  is found to predict the correct solution. The solution satisfying the required boundary conditions is given by

Despite the simple looking solution, the solution is verified to be accurate experimentally. Taylor–Culick profile with injection at the closed end of the cylinder can be solved analytically.

See also
Berman flow

References

Flow regimes
Fluid dynamics